Pacov is a town in Pelhřimov District in the Vysočina Region of the Czech Republic. It has about 4,600 inhabitants. The historic town centre is well preserved and is protected by law as an urban monument zone.

Administrative parts

Villages of Bedřichov, Jetřichovec, Roučkovice, Velká Rovná and Zhoř are administrative parts of Pacov.

Geography
It lies directly on the 15th meridian east. The town lies in the Křemešník Highlands. The area is rich in small ponds.

History
The first written mention of Pacov is from 1316. The settlement was probably founded in the late 13th century.

Pacov flourished in the 15th and 16th centuries. During this period, it obtained the town rights. The development ended with the Battle of White Mountain and Thirty Years' War. The second period of prosperity occurred in the 19th century. The foundations were laid for the current industry: food machinery industry and leather accessories manufacture. In 1888, the railway was built, which helped further expansion.

Demographics

Sport
Since 1906, there is a historical motorcycle racecourse in Pacov. The first international race in Austria-Hungary (and the third world-wide) took place here. The Pacov Circuit is still being used to this day.

Sights

Pacov has preserved historic centre with several valuable houses, including the former town hall from 1921–1923.

Pacov Château was originally a Gothic castle from the 12th century, rebuilt into a château in the 16th century. In 1718, it was rebuilt into a monastery. After the monastery was abolished by the reform of Joseph II in 1787, it was rebuilt to a château again. Today it houses the municipal office, tourist information centre, library and Antonín Sova Town Museum. The château complex includes a castle park with three ponds.

The deanery Church of Saint Michael the Archangel is a Gothic church from the late 14th century. Despite several reconstructions and repairs, its appearance has been roughly preserved. The Church of Saint Wenceslaus is a Baroque building from 1719, originally built as the monastery church. After it was damaged by fire in 1727, it was reconstructed in 1732. Nowadays it serves as a gallery.

The Jewish community is reminded by the Jewish cemetery and former synagogue. The cemetery was founded in 1680 and the oldest tombs are from the 18th century. The synagogue building is privately owned and closed to the public.

The village of Zhoř is protected as a village monument zone for its valuable preserved historical buildings with a high degree of urban preservation. The landmark of Zhoř is the Church of the Assumption of the Virgin Mary.

Notable people
Antonín Sova (1864–1928), poet
Jan Autengruber (1887–1920), painter
Jiří Němec (born 1966), footballer

Twin towns – sister cities

Pacov is twinned with:
 Arni, Switzerland

See also
Patzau, Wisconsin, named after Pacov

References

External links

Stražiště Microregion

Cities and towns in the Czech Republic
Populated places in Pelhřimov District